Dichodon may refer to:
 Dichodon (plant), a genus of flowering plants in the family Caryophyllaceae
 Dichodon (mammal), a fossil genus of mammals in the family Xiphodontidae